Paposh Nagar or Paposhnagar is a neighborhood in the Karachi Central district of Karachi, Pakistan.

There are several ethnic groups in Paposh Nagar including Muhajirs, Sindhis, Kashmiris, Seraikis, Pakhtuns, Balochis, Memons, Bohras, Ismailis and Christians.

Etymology
The etymology of Paposhnagar is that the words (Pa means foot ; posh means to wear ; nagar means town''') due to footwear and leather workshops and boutiques in the 1950-1970s. 

After the construction of the Abbasi Shaheed Hospital, this area slowly became identified with the hospital. 

Most of the footwear workshops have moved to other industrial and commercial areas of Karachi meanwhile some small business related to footwear business still have workshops in Chandni Chowk area. Majority of the people in this middle-class neighbourhood are Muhajirs who settled after the independence of Pakistan. The area was beautifully designed, with at least one central park, mosque and children playground and was linked with the rest of the city with Orangi railway station'' from where commuters can travel to westbound S.I.T.E. and eastbound towards the Karachi airport.

In popular culture
 In 2021, Express Entertainment released a serial titled as "Paposh Nagar Ki Neelam" depicting story of a girl from the neighborhood of Paposh Nagar.

See also 
 Abbasi Shaheed
 Abbasi Shaheed Hospital
 North Nazimabad Town
 Nazimabad

References

External links 
 Karachi Website

Neighbourhoods of Karachi
North Nazimabad Town